Douglas Roland Higgs FRS (born 13 January 1951) is a Professor of Molecular Haematology and director of the Weatherall Institute of Molecular Medicine, at the University of Oxford. He is known for his work on the regulation of alpha-globin and the genetics of alpha-thalassemia. He is currently working in understanding the mechanisms by which any mammalian gene is switched on and off during differentiation and development.

Education 
He was educated at Alleyn's School and qualified in medicine at King's College Hospital Medical School in 1974, and trained as a haematologist. He became a registrar in Haematology at Kings College Hospital in 1976.

Research and career 
He joined the Molecular Haematology Unit of the Medical Research Council at Oxford in 1977. In 1996 he was appointed Ad Hominem Professor of Molecular Haematology, in 2001 he became a director of the MRC Molecular Haematology Unit. In 2012 Higgs was appointed director of the Wetherall Institute of Molecular Medicine. Higgs is a Senior Kurti Fellow at Brasenose College, Oxford.

Honours and awards
1993 Fellow of the Royal College of Physicians
1994 Fellow of the Royal College of Pathologists
2001 Fellow of the Academy of Medical Sciences
2005 Fellow of the Royal Society
2013 Buchanan Medal of the Royal Society for "his seminal work on the regulation of the human alpha-globin gene cluster and the role of the ATRX protein in genetic disease."

Works

References

1951 births
Living people
People educated at Alleyn's School
Alumni of King's College London
Fellows of the Royal Society
Fellows of Brasenose College, Oxford
British haematologists